Green Youth may refer to one of the following youth wings of Green political parties:
Green Youth (Germany)
Young Greens of Sweden

See also
 Young Greens (disambiguation)
 :Category:Youth wings of green parties